The Clarendon Laboratory, located on Parks Road within the Science Area in Oxford, England (not to be confused with the Clarendon Building, also in Oxford), is part of the Department of Physics at Oxford University. It houses the atomic and laser physics, condensed matter physics, and biophysics groups within the Department, although four other Oxford Physics groups are not based in the Clarendon Lab. The Oxford Centre for Quantum Computation is also housed in the laboratory.

Buildings
The Clarendon Laboratory consists of two adjoining buildings, the Lindemann Building (named after Frederick Lindemann, 1st Viscount Cherwell) and the Grade II listed Townsend Building (named after Sir John Sealy Townsend).

The Beecroft Building (named after Adrian Beecroft) is now immediately in front of the Lindemann Building, completed in 2018 and designed by Hawkins\Brown, with a budget of approximately £40 million.

History

The Clarendon is named after Edward Hyde, 1st Earl of Clarendon, whose trustees paid £10,000 for the building of the original laboratory, completed in 1872, making it the oldest purpose-built physics laboratory in England. The building was designed by Robert Bellamy Clifton.

The brothers Fritz and Heinz London developed the London equations when working there in 1935.

In 2007, the laboratory was granted chemical landmark status.
The award was bestowed due to the work carried out by  Henry Gwyn Jeffreys Moseley in 1914.

Current use
The original building, substantially enlarged, is now part of the Oxford Earth Sciences Department.
The Oxford Electric Bell apparatus (also known as the Clarendon Dry Pile), constructed in 1840, is located in the foyer of the Clarendon Laboratory.

See also
 Department of Physics, University of Oxford
 Denys Wilkinson Building, a 1967 Department of Physics building
 Beecroft Building, a 2018 Department of Physics building

References

External links

 A brief history of Physics at Oxford 
 A longer history of Physics at Oxford 

1872 establishments in England
Educational institutions established in 1872
Buildings and structures completed in 1872
University and college laboratories in the United Kingdom
Department of Physics, University of Oxford
Physics laboratories
Grade II listed buildings in Oxford